The Alberta New Democratic Party, commonly shortened to Alberta's NDP, is a social-democratic political party in Alberta, Canada. It is the provincial Alberta affiliate of the federal New Democratic Party, and the successor to the Alberta section of the Co-operative Commonwealth Federation and the even earlier Alberta wing of the Canadian Labour Party and the United Farmers of Alberta. From the mid-1980s to 2004, the party abbreviated its name as the "New Democrats" (ND).

The party served as Official Opposition in the Legislative Assembly of Alberta from 1982 to 1993. It was shut out of the legislature following the 1993 election, returning in the 1997 election with two seats. The party won no more than four seats in subsequent elections until the 2015 election, in which it won 54 of the 87 seats in the legislature and formed a majority government. Until 2015, Alberta had been the only province in western Canada — the party's birthplace — where the NDP had never governed at the provincial level. The Alberta NDP was defeated after a single term in the 2019 election by the United Conservative Party–the first time that a governing party in Alberta had been unseated after a single term.

History

Origins and early years (1932–1962) 

The Co-operative Commonwealth Federation (CCF) was founded in Calgary on 1 August 1932 but organized in fits and starts in Alberta due to lack of support from the United Farmers of Alberta (UFA, which was the governing party in Alberta), and from the Labour Party, which had both sitting MPs and MLAs at the time. While most UFA Members of Parliament, led by William Irvine, supported the CCF and ran for re-election (unsuccessfully) in the 1935 federal election as CCF candidates, the bulk of UFA leaders and members were ambivalent to the new party. The CCF did not run candidates under its name in the 1935 provincial election because of its ties with the UFA and the Labour Party. The UFA lost all its seats in the election and fell into disarray. Federally, eight of the UFA Members of Parliament in the House of Commons of Canada ran as UFA-CCF candidates in the 1935 federal election - and were all defeated largely because of their association with the unpopular UFA government and the not-unrelated popularity of William Aberhart's radical Social Credit movement. In 1936, William Irvine, a CCF founder and defeated UFA Member of Parliament, was elected the Alberta CCF's first president. In 1937, the UFA decided to leave electoral politics entirely and, in 1938, the CCF committed itself to run candidates in the next provincial and elections setting up local riding clubs for that purpose. In 1939, former UFA/CCF MLA Chester Ronning became the Alberta CCF's first leader in the 1940 provincial election but despite winning 11% of the vote the party did not win any seats in the Alberta Legislature - the CCF had not garnered the support of the UFA's conservative supporters or put a dent in support for the agrarian populism of the Social Credit Party of Alberta.

The Alberta wing of the Labour Party federated with the CCF in 1935, but ran its own candidates in the 1935 and 1940 provincial elections. In 1942, the Alberta CCF clubs formally merged with the Labour Party and Elmer Roper became the new leader after achieving an unexpected victory in a 1942 by-election, becoming the party's first Alberta MLA (excepting Chester Ronning, who had been elected in 1932 as a joint UFA/CCF candidate). In the next two years party membership soared from 2,500 to over 12,000.

In the 1944 election, the CCF received 24% of the vote but won only 2 seats, due to the way the constituency boundaries were drawn, the single transferable vote system and the dominance of the Social Credit government, which received over 50% of ballots cast. Roper was joined in the legislature by Aylmer Liesemer, a Calgary schoolteacher. The rise of support for the CCF after 1942 mobilized the business community to pull out of efforts to build an anti-Social Credit party and instead back the Social Credit government, now led by Ernest Manning, after William Aberhart's death in 1943, as a bulwark against the socialists. Unlike the Saskatchewan CCF, which won office in the 1944 Saskatchewan election on a platform calling for social programs, the Alberta CCF was more radical and campaigned on provincial ownership of the province's resources and utilities. Irvine also advocated an alliance with the communist Labor-Progressive Party under Alberta's single transferable vote electoral system.

Through the 1940s and 1950s, the CCF's vote percentage declined, eventually falling under 10 percent. At any one time, the party never won more than two seats. The party was kept to two MLAs throughout the 1950s. Roper lost his seat in the 1955 election. In the same election, Stanley Ruzycki and Nick Dushenski were elected. Roper was succeeded as party leader by Floyd Albin Johnson. The 1959 general election was a disaster for the CCF, losing both its existing seats while Johnson, running in the Dunvegan electoral district, failed to win his seat, leaving the party shut out of the legislature.

The Alberta NDP in opposition (1962–2015) 

The CCF merged with the Canadian Labour Congress in 1961, becoming the New Democratic Party of Canada. In Alberta, the NDP was founded in 1962 with a new leader, Neil Reimer, Canadian director of the Oil Workers International Union. The NDP did not, at first, build much on the CCF's popularity, and, with the exception of a 1966 by-election victory by Garth Turcott, did not win any seats until the 1971 election when Grant Notley, who had taken over the party in 1968, was elected to the legislature.

Rise to Official Opposition 
With the election of the Alberta Progressive Conservatives in 1971, Social Credit gradually collapsed. The Alberta Liberal Party suffered in the late 1970s and early 1980s due to its shared name and links with the federal Liberal Party of Canada government of Prime Minister Pierre Trudeau, which was very unpopular in Alberta.

The decline of Social Credit and the unpopularity of the Liberals gave the New Democrats an opportunity to become the focus of opposition to the Lougheed-led Conservatives. Popularity of the NDP gradually increased under leader Grant Notley, who led the party from 1968 until his death in a plane crash in 1984, and was the party's sole MLA until 1982. In 1971, the NDP's popularity surpassed the 10% mark and went on to climb to 19% in the 1982 election. The party became the Official Opposition in 1982, though with only two seats. Notley was leading the NDP to what many thought was to be a major breakthrough before his death.

In the 1986 election, under Ray Martin, the party, now known as the "NDs," won almost 30% of the vote and 16 seats. This was to be an apex of New Democrat support. Party membership, which had rarely been more than 5,000 in the 1970s, reached 20,000 following the 1986 provincial election. The New Democrats were unable to gain additional seats in the 1989 election. While they were still the Official Opposition in the legislature by virtue of having more seats than the Liberals, the NDs' popular support fell behind the Liberals (26% to the Liberal's 28%) for the first time in decades.

Wipeout and recovery 

In the 1993 election, their popular vote fell by more than half to 11%, and they were shut out of the legislature altogether. This was mainly due to the anti-PC vote consolidating around the Liberals.  Both the Liberals and Tories were preaching the need for fiscal conservatism at the time. Ray Martin resigned as leader and was succeeded first by Ross Harvey and then by Pam Barrett. The party regained its presence in the legislature by winning two seats in the 1997 election. Barrett resigned her position as party leader in 2000 after claiming a near-death experience in a dentist's chair. She was succeeded by Raj Pannu. The party retained its two seats in the 2001 election.

In 2004, the party reverted to the traditional "NDP" abbreviation and the colour orange. That same year Raj Panu resigned as leader and was replaced by Brian Mason. In the 2004 Alberta general election the party doubled its seats from two to four - which re-elected then leader Brian Mason and Raj Pannu, returning former leader Ray Martin, and newcomer David Eggen. The party received 10% of the vote province-wide.

In the 2008 election the party was reduced to two seats. Brian Mason was re-elected as was newcomer Rachel Notley. Ray Martin and David Eggen were narrowly defeated. The party received 8.5% of the popular vote.

Attempts at political cooperation 

At its 2008 provincial convention, the party overwhelmingly rejected a proposal by the Environment Caucus recommending a party task force be mandated to "investigate a variety of options for political cooperation with the Alberta Liberals and/or Greens." and "to prepare a motion to be considered" at the next Party Convention.
The proposal was opposed by NDP leader Brian Mason.

Alberta Federation of Labour president Gil McGowan had, independently from the Environment Caucus, distributed a detailed discussion paper advocating that the NDP form a one or two election cooperation pact with the Alberta Liberal Party and Alberta Greens in which parties would not run against each other in certain ridings in hopes of defeating Progressive Conservative candidates. It was called  The Way Forward: An AFL proposal for a united alternative to the Conservatives.

McGowan was unable to speak to the NDEnvirocaucus motion on cooperation before the question was called. However, just after the resolution was soundly defeated, and during his report to the Convention as AFL President, he addressed the issue. He urged members to admit, in the face of 40 years of Tory government and the recent disappointing election results, that there was a problem and that significant change was called for.

Growing momentum 
In the 2012 provincial election the NDP picked up two seats in Edmonton, regaining their previous 4 seat total. Both Rachel Notley and Brian Mason safely held onto their seats while David Eggen was re-elected as the member for Edmonton-Calder. Newcomer Deron Bilous was also elected in Edmonton-Beverly-Clareview, the seat formerly held by Martin. In many other ridings the party also won more votes than it had attained previously.

On April 29, 2014, Brian Mason announced that he would step down as leader as soon as a leadership election could be held to choose his successor. The leadership convention was held in Edmonton from October 18 to October 19, 2014. Rachel Notley was elected as the party's next leader, defeating fellow MLA David Eggen and union leader Rod Loyola in the first ballot with 70% of the vote.

First government (2015–2019)

The incumbent PC premier Jim Prentice called an election on April 7, 2015, following the reveal of a new budget to strengthen his party's mandate. On election night, the NDP won 54 seats, re-electing all four of their incumbents as well as 50 new members to the legislative assembly. The NDP had expected to do well in Edmonton. Not only was Notley from an Edmonton riding, but Edmonton has historically been friendlier to centre-left parties than the rest of Alberta. However, in a result that exceeded even the most optimistic NDP projections, the party took every seat in the capital. It also swept the cities of Red Deer and Lethbridge, and took 15 seats in Calgary, the Tories' power base for four decades. They also won 16 additional seats in the rest of Alberta, mostly in the northern and central parts of the province.

The Notley Government was characterized by a small cabinet and an intense focus on the economy. At the time of the early election call Alberta was sinking into a deep recession caused by the collapse of world oil prices. As a result of the province's dependence on oil royalties over more traditional revenue sources, Alberta's deficit soared. After reversing prior budget cuts, Notley mostly shied away from major wealth redistribution and preferred to stimulate the economy through infrastructure spending and maintaining public services. Most new programs, such as school lunches, were introduced cautiously through pilot programs. Despite ostensibly being a party of labour, the NDP froze wages and generally took the side of management in labour disputes, and a higher minimum wage was phased in relatively slowly. Labour code changes were generally incremental, though an update to labour standards on farms was extremely divisive in rural Alberta. However, Notley moved forwards with a carbon pricing scheme and plans for sustainability and energy transitions early in her term. Controversially such plans were framed around creating a social license for pursuing oil sand expansion, and she championed the creation of pipelines and partnered heavily with the oil industry. As a result plans to raise oil royalties were scrapped, and tax increases on corporations and higher income brackets were modest. Eventually this led to a schism between the NDP governments of Alberta and British Columbia over the twinning of the Transmountain Pipeline, which remained a contentious project in the Canadian political arena and particularly within the federal New Democratic Party. While the Alberta economy recovered from the depths of the energy recession by 2019, the oil industry remained relatively stagnant and economic growth had been nowhere near what Alberta had enjoyed in the previous decade.

Return to Opposition (2019–present)

The NDP was dealt a severe blow when the PCs and Wildrose merged to form the United Conservative Party, which immediately ascended to a large lead in opinion polling. At the 2019 election, the NDP was roundly defeated by the UCP, under the leadership of former federal minister Jason Kenney. Though Notley received more votes in total than the previous election, turnout surged dramatically in Kenney's direction. The NDP was cut down to 24 seats on 32.7 percent of the vote from 54 seats and 40.6 percent of the vote. The party more than held its own in Edmonton, where it won 19 of 20 seats. However, it was almost shut out in the rest of the province, losing all but three seats in Calgary, one seat in the Edmonton suburbs, and one seat in Lethbridge. It is the first time in the province's history that an incumbent government has been defeated after only one term. Notley's popularity within the NDP remained firm, and she stayed on as Leader of the Opposition, helming the largest opposition caucus in the province since Laurence Decore's Liberals won 32 seats in 1993.

Party Leaders

 denotes acting or interim leader

CCF

NDP

Election results

Current Alberta New Democrat MLAs

¹Out of legislature 2008-2012.

See also
 List of articles about Alberta CCF/NDP members
 List of Alberta general elections
 List of Alberta political parties
 Alberta New Democratic Party leadership elections
 Alberta New Democratic Party candidates in the 2012 Alberta provincial election

References

External links
Alberta NDP
The Socialist Party - CCF/NDP in Alberta
 The Rise and Fall of the Labour Party in Alberta, 1917-42

 
Organizations based in Edmonton
Political parties established in 1932
New Democratic Party
Social democratic parties in Canada
1932 establishments in Alberta